Pavel Pavlovich (born 14 February 1893, date of death unknown) was a Russian wrestler. He competed in the featherweight event at the 1912 Summer Olympics.

References

External links
 

1893 births
Year of death missing
Olympic wrestlers of Russia
Wrestlers at the 1912 Summer Olympics
Russian male sport wrestlers
Sportspeople from Saint Petersburg